Liberación is a district in the department of San Pedro, Paraguay.

References 

Populated places in the San Pedro Department, Paraguay